Shixing, also rendered Shuhi, is a poorly-attested Qiangic language of Sichuan and the Tibet Autonomous Region. Two-thirds of its speakers are monolingual.

Shixing is also known by its Tibetan name Xumi (旭米 Xùmǐ); it is spoken by about 1800 people living by the Shuiluo River 水洛 in Shuiluo Township 水洛乡, Mili Tibetan Autonomous County.

Katia Chirkova reports two varieties.
Upper Xumi
Lower Xumi

Phonology

Consonants

Xumi features a very unusual phonemic contrast between voiceless  and voiced  alveolo-palatal lateral approximants.

In the table above, italic phonemes only appear in the Upper Xumi dialect while bold phonemes only appear in the Lower Xumi dialect. All others appear in both Upper and Lower Xumi.

Vowels

Oral
 The close and close-mid series are the same in both varieties: .
 At least in Lower Xumi , is phonetically close-mid .
  is closer in Upper Xumi ; in addition, the open central vowel  is phonetically near-open .

Nasal
 Upper Xumi has the following nasal vowels: , as well as the marginal , which occurs only in the word  'on the roof / upstairs'.
 Lower Xumi has the following nasal vowels: , as well as the marginal , which occurs only in the word  'on the roof / upstairs'.  generally correspond to Upper Xumi , respectively.

References

Bibliography

 
 
Sun Hongkai [孙宏开]. 2014. A study of Shixing [Shixingyu yanjiu 史兴语研究]. Beijing: Minzu University Press.

Loloish languages
Qiangic languages
Languages of China